The French Road Cycling Cup (English for Coupe de France de cyclisme sur route) is a road bicycle racing competition under the Fédération Francaise de Cyclisme (French Cycling Federation) each year since 1992. It consists of a number of one-day races in France each year. Each of these races is open for all riders, but until 2015 only French riders and riders who were part of a French team were able to score points for the French Road Cycling Cup. As of 2016, all riders score points. The team competition remains a contest between the French teams only.

Points system 
For the individual rankings, points are awarded to all eligible riders each race according to the following table:

Each race, the positions of the first three riders of each French team are added to give the team position. The team with the lowest team position is the winner of the team competition for that race. E.g.: a team having their first three riders all on the podium will have a team position score of 1+2+3=6 and since no other team will have a lower team position, this team will win 12 points for the team standings. Note that only French teams can score points.

Winners

Individual

Young riders

Teams

Statistics 
 Most times overall winner: Samuel Dumoulin (3 wins)
 Most race wins: Jaan Kirsipuu (15 wins)
 Most race wins in one season: Samuel Dumoulin (4 wins in 2016)

See also 
 Belgian Road Cycling Cup
 Italian Road Cycling Cup

Notes

External links 
Fédération francaise de cyclisme 

 
Cycle racing in France
Cycle racing series
Recurring sporting events established in 1992
1992 establishments in France